Selçuklu YHT railway station, or Selçuklu HSR railway station is a railway station in Konya, Turkey. Opened on 2 October 2021, it is the main high-speed railway station in the city, while Konya station is the main inter-city station. Built on the Polatlı-Konya high-speed railway, the station exclusively services high-speed YHT train from Konya to Ankara and Istanbul.  Selçuklu station is the second largest high-speed railway station in Turkey, after Ankara station, with 3 platforms serving 5 tracks and 2 tracks bypassing the station for freight rail.

Gallery

References

Railway stations in Konya Province
High-speed railway stations in Turkey
Railway stations opened in 2021
Selçuklu District